Social Development Fund of IDP of the Republic of Azerbaijan is located in the city of Baku. It focuses on the improvement of life conditions of internally displaced population of the Republic of Azerbaijan who reside in the buildings that are dangerous to live or built due to specific purposes (military, education especially dormitories, or healthcare) and in Baku, Sumgait and other cities and districts of the country by implementation of economic development plans aims to reduce poverty, create new work places, establish agricultural facilities (especially, for people who are busy for this sector) and so on. The Supreme is governed by the supreme body “Board of Observers.”

General information 
The fund operates under the Cabinet of Ministers of the Republic of Azerbaijan according to the resolution of the President of the Republic of Azerbaijan.

The fund conduct its activities in accordance with the law of the Republic of Azerbaijan, instructions of the President and Cabinet of Ministers of the Republic of Azerbaijan, and Guide for Operations that basically defines the principles the fund should follow.

The fund was established for non-commercial purposes.

History 
The Social Development Fund of IDP of the Republic of Azerbaijan was established based on the presidential decree “On solving the problems of refugees and internally displaced persons” dated to 6 December 1999.

Objectives 
The major goal of the fund is to create better environment for IDP people by allocation of finance and implementation of effective usage of it in order to improve social infrastructure and standards of life. For this purpose, the fund attempt to prepare and develop certain proposals that suggest opening of new work places and realization of micro-projects in order to reduce poverty and increase the quality of life.

Rights of the fund 
Entering into agreements within the territory of the Republic of Azerbaijan and abroad with legal entities;

Using the property that is under its control;

Purchasing and hiring different kinds of moveable and immoveable property in accordance with the legislation of the Republic of Azerbaijan;

Setting up relations with organizations, banks or other entities according to the law;

Opening accounts within the country and obtain credits in Azerbaijani manat or other foreign currencies;

Using the services of experts and advisors who are working independently from the fund in order to carry out its duties.

External links 
State Committee of the Republic of Azerbaijan for the Issues of Refugees and Internally Displaced Persons

References 

Government of Azerbaijan
Government agencies of Azerbaijan